"Style ~Get Glory in This Hand~" is a single released by High and Mighty Color on October 31, 2005, less than two months after the band's debut album Go Over.

Track list
 "STYLE ~get glory in this hand~" – 4:14
 "energy" – 5:15

All songs written by HIGH and MIGHTY COLOR.

Personnel
 Maakii & Yuusuke — vocals
 Kazuto — guitar
 MEG — guitar
 mACKAz — bass
 SASSY — drums

Production
 Hide2 (Norishrocks) – creative & art direction
 Tsousie (Jetrock Graphics) – art direction & design
 Rocca Works – costume
 Eiji Tanaki (D&N Planning) – styling
 Keiko Nakatani (Mingle) – hair and make-up
 Atsushi Otaki (Ad Force), Masahiro Aoki (D&N Planning), Noriko Yamashita (SMC) & Kaori"Kacch" Nagai (Norishrocks) – products coordination

Charts
Oricon Sales Chart (Japan)

References

2005 singles
High and Mighty Color songs
2005 songs